Očeta Vincenca smrt is a novel by Slovenian author Peter Božič. It was first published in 1979.

See also
List of Slovenian novels

Slovenian novels
1979 novels